NCAA Basketball 10 is a basketball video game developed by EA Canada and published by Electronic Arts. It was released on November 17, 2009 for Xbox 360 and PlayStation 3. Former University of Oklahoma and current NBA forward  Blake Griffin is featured on the cover.

On February 10, 2010 EA officially announced that all future NCAA Basketball games would be put on hold and that there were no plans for releasing anymore titles in 2010. That year, the game was not released on the PlayStation 2. On August 11, 2011, all online services were discontinued.

Demo 
A demo was released to the Xbox 360 marketplace on November 5, 2009, and on the PlayStation Network on November 19, 2009. It featured North Carolina and Duke in one five-minute half at Cameron Indoor Stadium.

Features 
 New authentic broadcasting presentations of ESPN and CBS Sports, featuring announcing crews of Dick Vitale, Brad Nessler, and Erin Andrews for ESPN, and Gus Johnson and Bill Raftery for CBS Sports.
 Users are now able to choose from multiple offenses that include the Dribble Drive, Princeton, Flex and others.
 The game features the 20 Toughest Places to Play as voted by the fans
 Real-life RPI ratings and stats from every Division I school are imported into the game every week.
 The game features more than 100 improvements including player movement, rebounding, off-ball collisions, alley-oops, size-ups, and more.
 Improved Coach Feedback System and Team Tempo Control enables users to execute their gameplan to perfection.
 Dynasty mode enhancements

The game includes 325 of the 353 schools in NCAA Division I. Nine Programs that are fully classified as D-I were left out as well as 13 transitional programs. Division II Chaminade is playable in the included Maui Invitational Tournament.

EA intended to release the game with the same 64 historical teams that were included in NCAA Basketball 09, but due to issues brought about by the O'Bannon v. NCAA lawsuit filed by former UCLA & NBA player Ed O'Bannon, they were removed from the game prior to release.

Reception 

The game received "generally favorable reviews" on both platforms according to the review aggregation website Metacritic.

See also
NBA Live 10

References

External links 
 
 Game information on EBGames.com

2009 video games
PlayStation 3 games
Xbox 360 games
EA Sports games
NCAA video games
North America-exclusive video games
Basketball video games
Video games developed in Canada